This is a list of currency of Spain. The current currency since 2002 is the Euro.

List

Other coins
 Dobla
 Columnarios
 Doubloon
 Picayune
 Spanish dollar
 Spanish the euro coins

See also
 Currency of Spanish America
 Céntimo